This is a list of singles that charted in the top ten of the ARIA Charts in 2018. In 2018, twenty-six acts reached the top ten for the first time.

Top-ten singles

Key

2017 peaks

2019 peaks 

Notes:
The single re-entered the top 10 on 1 January 2018.
The single re-entered the top 10 on 8 January 2018.
The single re-entered the top 10 on 5 February 2018.
The single re-entered the top 10 on 12 February 2018.
The single re-entered the top 10 on 19 March 2018.
The single re-entered the top 10 on 4 June 2018.
The single re-entered the top 10 on 18 June 2018.
The single re-entered the top 10 on 25 June 2018.
The singles re-entered the top 10 on 9 July 2018.
The single re-entered the top 10 on 23 July 2018.
The singles re-entered the top 10 on 30 July 2018.
The single re-entered the top 10 on 27 August 2018.
The single re-entered the top 10 on 3 September 2018.
The single re-entered the top 10 on 17 September 2018.
The single re-entered the top 10 on 19 November 2018.
The single re-entered the top 10 on 10 December 2018.
The single re-entered the top 10 on 24 December 2018.

Entries by artist
The following table shows artists who achieved two or more top 10 entries in 2018, including songs that reached their peak in 2017 and 2019. The figures include both main artists and featured artists. The total number of weeks an artist spent in the top ten in 2018 is also shown.

See also
2018 in music
ARIA Charts
List of number-one singles of 2018 (Australia)
List of top 10 albums in 2018 (Australia)

Notes

References

Australia Singles Top 10
Top 10 singles
Top 10 singles 2018
Australia 2018